Dean Lake is a lake in the northwestern corner of Duchesne County, Utah, United States.

The lake is one of the four lakes located in the Four Lakes Basin within the High Uintas Wilderness in the Uinta-Wasatch-Cache National Forest. Dean Lake bears the name of Dean Clyde.

See also

 List of lakes in Utah

References

Lakes of Utah
Features of the Uinta Mountains
Lakes of Duchesne County, Utah
Wasatch-Cache National Forest